Fyodorovsky (masculine), Fyodorovskaya (feminine), or Fyodorovskoye (neuter) is the name of several inhabited localities in Russia.

Modern localities

Bryansk Oblast
As of 2010, one rural locality in Bryansk Oblast bears this name:
Fyodorovskoye, Bryansk Oblast, a selo in Fyodorovsky Selsoviet of Rognedinsky District

Ivanovo Oblast
As of 2010, two rural localities in Ivanovo Oblast bear this name:
Fyodorovskoye, Ivanovo Oblast, a village in Ilyinsky District
Fyodorovskaya, Ivanovo Oblast, a village in Lukhsky District

Kaluga Oblast
As of 2010, one rural locality in Kaluga Oblast bears this name:
Fyodorovskoye, Kaluga Oblast, a selo in Zhukovsky District

Khanty-Mansi Autonomous Okrug
As of 2010, one urban locality in Khanty-Mansi Autonomous Okrug bears this name:
Fyodorovsky, Khanty-Mansi Autonomous Okrug, an urban-type settlement in Surgutsky District

Kirov Oblast
As of 2010, one rural locality in Kirov Oblast bears this name:
Fyodorovskaya, Kirov Oblast, a village in Oktyabrsky Rural Okrug of Podosinovsky District

Kostroma Oblast
As of 2012, seven rural localities in Kostroma Oblast bear this name:
Fyodorovsky, Kostroma Oblast, a khutor under the administrative jurisdiction of Ponazyrevo Urban Settlement (urban-type settlement) of Ponazyrevsky District
Fyodorovskoye, Chukhlomsky District, Kostroma Oblast, a village in Nozhkinskoye Settlement of Chukhlomsky District
Fyodorovskoye, Orekhovskoye Settlement, Galichsky District, Kostroma Oblast, a village in Orekhovskoye Settlement of Galichsky District
Fyodorovskoye, Orekhovskoye Settlement, Galichsky District, Kostroma Oblast, a village in Orekhovskoye Settlement of Galichsky District
Fyodorovskoye, Makaryevsky District, Kostroma Oblast, a village in Shemyatinskoye Settlement of Makaryevsky District
Fyodorovskoye, Mezhevskoy District, Kostroma Oblast, a village in Georgiyevskoye Settlement of Mezhevskoy District
Fyodorovskoye, Nerekhtsky District, Kostroma Oblast, a selo in Prigorodnoye Settlement of Nerekhtsky District

Leningrad Oblast
As of 2010, two rural localities in Leningrad Oblast bear this name:
Fyodorovskoye, Leningrad Oblast, a village in Fyodorovskoye Settlement Municipal Formation of Tosnensky District
Fyodorovskaya, Leningrad Oblast, a village in Vinnitskoye Settlement Municipal Formation of Podporozhsky District

Moscow Oblast
As of 2010, ten rural localities in Moscow Oblast bear this name:
Fyodorovskoye, Dmitrovsky District, Moscow Oblast, a village in Kostinskoye Rural Settlement of Dmitrovsky District
Fyodorovskoye, Lukhovitsky District, Moscow Oblast, a village in Gazoprovodskoye Rural Settlement of Lukhovitsky District
Fyodorovskoye, Mozhaysky District, Moscow Oblast, a village under the administrative jurisdiction of the work settlement of Uvarovka, Mozhaysky District, Moscow Oblast
Fyodorovskoye, Naro-Fominsky District, Moscow Oblast, a village in Novofyodorovskoye Rural Settlement of Naro-Fominsky District
Fyodorovskoye, Pushkinsky District, Moscow Oblast, a village in Tsarevskoye Rural Settlement of Pushkinsky District
Fyodorovskoye, Sergiyevo-Posadsky District, Moscow Oblast, a village under the administrative jurisdiction of the work settlement of  Bogorodskoye, Sergiyevo-Posadsky District
Fyodorovskoye, Stupinsky District, Moscow Oblast, a selo in Aksinyinskoye Rural Settlement of Stupinsky District
Fyodorovskoye, Taldomsky District, Moscow Oblast, a village in Kvashenkovskoye Rural Settlement of Taldomsky District
Fyodorovskoye, Volokolamsky District, Moscow Oblast, a selo in Yaropoletskoye Rural Settlement of Volokolamsky District
Fyodorovskaya, Moscow Oblast, a village in Dmitrovskoye Rural Settlement of Shatursky District

Nizhny Novgorod Oblast
As of 2010, three rural localities in Nizhny Novgorod Oblast bear this name:
Fyodorovsky, Nizhny Novgorod Oblast, a pochinok in Gorevsky Selsoviet of Urensky District
Fyodorovskoye, Gorodetsky District, Nizhny Novgorod Oblast, a village in Timiryazevsky Selsoviet of Gorodetsky District
Fyodorovskoye, Vetluzhsky District, Nizhny Novgorod Oblast, a village in Kruttsovsky Selsoviet of Vetluzhsky District

Novosibirsk Oblast
As of 2010, one rural locality in Novosibirsk Oblast bears this name:
Fyodorovsky, Novosibirsk Oblast, a settlement in Suzunsky District

Orenburg Oblast
As of 2010, one rural locality in Orenburg Oblast bears this name:
Fyodorovsky, Orenburg Oblast, a khutor in Krasnooktyabrsky Selsoviet of Oktyabrsky District

Pskov Oblast
As of 2010, four rural localities in Pskov Oblast bear this name:
Fyodorovskoye, Loknyansky District, Pskov Oblast, a village in Loknyansky District
Fyodorovskoye, Novosokolnichesky District, Pskov Oblast, a village in Novosokolnichesky District
Fyodorovskoye, Opochetsky District, Pskov Oblast, a village in Opochetsky District
Fyodorovskoye, Ostrovsky District, Pskov Oblast, a village in Ostrovsky District

Ryazan Oblast
As of 2010, one rural locality in Ryazan Oblast bears this name:
Fyodorovskoye, Ryazan Oblast, a selo in Fyodorovsky Rural Okrug of Zakharovsky District

Smolensk Oblast
As of 2010, three rural localities in Smolensk Oblast bear this name:
Fyodorovskoye, Roslavlsky District, Smolensk Oblast, a village in Astapkovichskoye Rural Settlement of Roslavlsky District
Fyodorovskoye, Ugransky District, Smolensk Oblast, a village under the administrative jurisdiction of Ugranskoye Urban Settlement of Ugransky District
Fyodorovskoye, Vyazemsky District, Smolensk Oblast, a village in Novoselskoye Rural Settlement of Vyazemsky District, Smolensk Oblast

Stavropol Krai
As of 2010, one rural locality in Stavropol Krai bears this name:
Fyodorovsky, Stavropol Krai, a khutor under the administrative jurisdiction of the town of Zelenokumsk, Sovetsky District

Republic of Tatarstan
As of 2010, two rural localities in the Republic of Tatarstan bear this name:
Fyodorovsky, Republic of Tatarstan, a settlement in Aksubayevsky District
Fyodorovskoye, Republic of Tatarstan, a selo in Kaybitsky District

Tver Oblast
As of 2010, six rural localities in Tver Oblast bear this name:
Fyodorovskoye, Kalininsky District, Tver Oblast, a village in Kalininsky District
Fyodorovskoye, Kalyazinsky District, Tver Oblast, a village in Kalyazinsky District
Fyodorovskoye, Kashinsky District, Tver Oblast, a village in Kashinsky District
Fyodorovskoye, Konakovsky District, Tver Oblast, a village in Konakovsky District
Fyodorovskoye, Sonkovsky District, Tver Oblast, a village in Sonkovsky District
Fyodorovskoye, Zubtsovsky District, Tver Oblast, a village in Zubtsovsky District

Vladimir Oblast
As of 2010, five rural localities in Vladimir Oblast bear this name:
Fyodorovskoye, Alexandrovsky District, Vladimir Oblast, a village in Alexandrovsky District
Fyodorovskoye, Kirzhachsky District, Vladimir Oblast, a village in Kirzhachsky District
Fyodorovskoye, Suzdalsky District, Vladimir Oblast, a selo in Suzdalsky District
Fyodorovskoye (Simskoye Rural Settlement), Yuryev-Polsky District, Vladimir Oblast, a selo in Yuryev-Polsky District; municipally, a part of Simskoye Rural Settlement of that district
Fyodorovskoye (Nebylovskoye Rural Settlement), Yuryev-Polsky District, Vladimir Oblast, a selo in Yuryev-Polsky District; municipally, a part of Nebylovskoye Rural Settlement of that district

Vologda Oblast
As of 2010, ten rural localities in Vologda Oblast bear this name:
Fyodorovskoye, Kharovsky District, Vologda Oblast, a village in Kubinsky Selsoviet of Kharovsky District
Fyodorovskoye, Ustyuzhensky District, Vologda Oblast, a village in Persky Selsoviet of Ustyuzhensky District
Fyodorovskoye, Velikoustyugsky District, Vologda Oblast, a village in Shemogodsky Selsoviet of Velikoustyugsky District
Fyodorovskaya, Belozersky District, Vologda Oblast, a village in Gulinsky Selsoviet of Belozersky District
Fyodorovskaya, Kharovsky District, Vologda Oblast, a village in Kharovsky Selsoviet of Kharovsky District
Fyodorovskaya, Totemsky District, Vologda Oblast, a village in Pogorelovsky Selsoviet of Totemsky District
Fyodorovskaya, Ust-Kubinsky District, Vologda Oblast, a village in Troitsky Selsoviet of Ust-Kubinsky District
Fyodorovskaya, Vashkinsky District, Vologda Oblast, a village in Andreyevsky Selsoviet of Vashkinsky District
Fyodorovskaya, Velikoustyugsky District, Vologda Oblast, a village in Yudinsky Selsoviet of Velikoustyugsky District
Fyodorovskaya, Vytegorsky District, Vologda Oblast, a village in Ankhimovsky Selsoviet of Vytegorsky District

Voronezh Oblast
As of 2010, one rural locality in Voronezh Oblast bears this name:
Fyodorovsky, Voronezh Oblast, a khutor in Sredneikoretskoye Rural Settlement of Liskinsky District

Yaroslavl Oblast
As of 2010, seven rural localities in Yaroslavl Oblast bear this name:
Fyodorovskoye, Danilovsky District, Yaroslavl Oblast, a village in Pokrovsky Rural Okrug of Danilovsky District
Fyodorovskoye, Gavrilov-Yamsky District, Yaroslavl Oblast, a village in Zayachye-Kholmsky Rural Okrug of Gavrilov-Yamsky District
Fyodorovskoye, Rostovsky District, Yaroslavl Oblast, a village in Moseytsevsky Rural Okrug of Rostovsky District
Fyodorovskoye, Nazarovsky Rural Okrug, Rybinsky District, Yaroslavl Oblast, a village in Nazarovsky Rural Okrug of Rybinsky District
Fyodorovskoye, Shashkovsky Rural Okrug, Rybinsky District, Yaroslavl Oblast, a village in Shashkovsky Rural Okrug of Rybinsky District
Fyodorovskoye, Lyutovsky Rural Okrug, Yaroslavsky District, Yaroslavl Oblast, a village in Lyutovsky Rural Okrug of Yaroslavsky District
Fyodorovskoye, Ryutnevsky Rural Okrug, Yaroslavsky District, Yaroslavl Oblast, a selo in Ryutnevsky Rural Okrug of Yaroslavsky District

Abolished localities
Fyodorovskoye, Ponazyrevsky District, Kostroma Oblast, a village in Ponazyrevsky Selsoviet of Ponazyrevsky District of Kostroma Oblast; abolished on August 30, 2004

References

Notes

Sources